Daesong Market (lit. Daesong Agricultural Market) is a traditional street market in Dong-gu, Ulsan, South Korea. The market has many shops that sell fruits, vegetables, meat, fish, breads, clothing, and traditional Korean medicine. The market also contains many restaurants and street-food stalls.

Renovations
Due to the emergence of large discount stores in Ulsan, the city government began a market-revival initiative in the mid-2000s to improve the infrastructure around Ulsan's traditional markets, while attempting to maintain their traditional atmosphere. The renovations for Daesong Agricultural Market started in September 2007 and included toilet maintenance, installation of fire-fighting equipment, and the installation of a 362-meter long, 8 m wide arcade to keep shoppers dry in rainy weather.

See also
 List of markets in South Korea
 List of South Korean tourist attractions

References

Dong District, Ulsan
Retail markets in Ulsan
Food markets in South Korea